Józef Rojek (born 20 March 1950 in Ropczyce) is a Polish politician. He was elected to the Sejm on 25 September 2005, getting 13409 votes in 15 Tarnów district as a candidate from the Law and Justice list.

On 12 November 2006 Rojek ran for the position of mayor of Tarnów but was not elected. However he was elected to the Tarnów town council. Therefore, he was required by Article 177 of the Parliamentary and Senate Representation of the People Act to give up his post in the Sejm. However Rojek told PAP that he does not want to cease being an MP and that he has submitted a query to the National Electoral Commission.

See also
Members of Polish Sejm 2005-2007

External links
Józef Rojek - parliamentary page - includes declarations of interest, voting record, and transcripts of speeches.

1950 births
Living people
People from Ropczyce-Sędziszów County
Solidarity Electoral Action politicians
Law and Justice politicians
Members of the Polish Sejm 2005–2007
Members of the Polish Sejm 2007–2011
Members of the Polish Sejm 2011–2015